Charles Edward Victor Seneviratne Corea was born in Chilaw, Sri Lanka, on 29 January 1871 to Charles Edward Bandaranaike Corea, a famous lawyer, and Henrietta Seneviratne. He was the youngest out of five children, three boys and two girls, Charles Edgar Corea, James Alfred Ernest Corea, Agnes Corea and Evangeline Corea. This family was acknowledged to be one of the wealthiest families in the whole of Ceylon. Victor's family was severely affected when Charles Edward Bandaranaike Corea died in 1872, leaving five children, of whom the youngest, Victor Corea, was only one year old. The five young children depended on their young, widowed 21-year-old mother to look after them. He attended the prestigious S. Thomas' College, Mount Lavinia, where he excelled in his studies.

Politics

After leaving school, Victor Corea entered politics, like most of the men in the Corea family. His father also was in the legal profession, being a proctor as well as his brother Charles Edgar Corea who was a very successful proctor and a member of the legislative council. He became an advocate of the Supreme Court and in September 1922 he was elected founder president of the Ceylon Labour Union which was led by A. E. Goonesinha. During the 1920s he was active in the Ceylon Labour Party. He successfully abolished Poll Tax and after this he became one of the most popular men in Chilaw. He then contested a seat in 1924 for the legislative council, he ran against E. W. Jayawardene and won comfortably. The Coreas and the Jayawardene family are related through marriage. Victor was elected a founder member of the Ceylon National Congress. According to the Asia Times, 'During the period 1915 to 1928, members of the Ceylon National Congress, in combination with various political groups, devoted their attention to reforming the political administrative structure of the island.

Their principal demands were related to the manner in which the electoral constituencies should take shape, the composition of the Legislative Council and extension of its powers and the composition and the role of the Executive Council and proposals regarding the franchise. Improvements of the local government administration and the "Ceylonization" of the public services were also presented, but received lesser emphasis.

In December 1919 the Ceylon National Congress adopted the following resolutions:
"The congress declares that, for the better government of the island and the happiness and contentment of the people, and as a step towards the realisation of responsible government in Ceylon as an integral part of the British Empire, the constitution and administration of Ceylon should be immediately reformed in the following particulars, to wit:
'That the Legislative Council should consist of about 50 members, of whom at least four-fifths should be elected on the basis of a territorial electorate, upon a wide male franchise and a restricted female franchise, and the remaining one-fifth should consist of official members and of unofficial members to represent important minorities, and the council should elect its own speaker.'". Victor Corea's brother, Charles Edgar Corea was elected president of the Ceylon National Congress in 1924.

Sri Lankan author Kumari Jayawardena, writing about the Coreas observed: 'Unconnected to the liquor trade but making their money on plantation ventures was the Corea Family of Chilaw, an influential goyigama group with a history going back to Portuguese rule when they were warriors to Sinhala kings. During Dutch and British rule, members of the family were officials serving the state in various ways and rewarded with titles. Some members of the family took to the legal and medical professions, most notably the sons of Charles Edward Corea (a solicitor), who were active in local politics and in the Chilaw Association which campaigned against British land policies – especially the Waste Lands Ordinance, and for political reforms. The most active of Corea's sons was C.E.(Charles Edgar) who spoke up for peasant rights and was militant in his stand against the government. He was President of the Ceylon National Congress in 1924. C.E. Corea's brother, Alfred Ernest, was a doctor and the youngest Victor Corea was a lawyer who achieved fame for leading a campaign (and going to jail) in 1922 to protest the Poll Tax on all males; he was the first President of the Ceylon Labour Union led by A.E.Goonesinha and was active in the Ceylon Labour Party. While being professionals and political activists, the Coreas were also important landowners.

Freedom fighter

As well as being a successful Advocate and politician, Victor Corea also spent much of his time fighting for Sri Lanka's independence against the British or against anyone or anything where there wasn't justice. He fought fearlessly with the help of his older brother Charles Edgar Corea and became two of the most famous Political figures their country had ever seen, and were particularly well known in their hometown Chilaw. They were respected people and in Jaffna they were acclaimed as outstanding leaders. in 1921 Victor Corea refused to pay Poll Tax. Every male who was over the age of 21 in Ceylon had to pay this and it would go to the British Government. Victor wrote to the governor and said that according to their law he should be arrested. Victor Corea was then arrested and put in prison. He suffered much pain by doing work in a very hot climate such as crushing metal, beating coconut husks and twisting rope. All this work was done where the public could see him. He continued to do this work even though he had to go through a lot of pain. The British realised that Victor had become a national hero. Many people came from all over the country to see a man of high standing fight for his people and for the independence of Ceylon. The British released him from prison and also abolished Poll Tax, they had realised by keeping him in prison he had gained a lot of fame and popularity. Victor Corea then addressed his supporters at the Tower Hall, this was shortly after his release. The Times of Ceylon wrote this article:

"The Tower Hall in Maradana was the scene of an electrifying drama. But Annie Boteju and Marshall Perera were not the star attractions. The occasion was a political meeting. It was the climax of a day of national mourning in remembrance of the declaration of Martial Law on 4 June 1915. As this story unfolds, the Speaker on the platform is C.E. Victor S.Corea.

"June 4, 1922 was a Sunday and the thousands who packed the Tower Hall and its environs exploded in an orgasm of applause. The Times of Ceylon, always a faithful barometer of the political climate, recorded the next day that the Tower Hall was packed to utmost capacity. On the verandahs outside, a tightly wedged mass of humanity surged to and fro, a large number remaining on the street outside."

"Such was the magnetic attraction of C.E. Victor S. Corea that the police party present was led by the Acting Inspector General of Police himself."

Mohandas Gandhi's visit in 1927

Victor Corea and his brother Charles Edgar Corea had been in touch with Mohandas K. Gandhi. In 1927 Gandhi visited Ceylon because of his contact with the Corea family. He travelled the whole country visiting people of different backgrounds and religion. Mahatma Gandhi travelled to Chilaw and stayed for a few days with the Corea Family in a home situated in the town, called 'Sigiriya', it was the home of Victor's sister Agnes Corea. Gandhi presented a poster to Victor Corea, as a recognition of his bravery against the British. According to the Sunday Observer newspaper of Sri Lanka: 'When Mahatma Gandhi came to Ceylon he visited Chilaw to attend a banquet that was hosted by the Coreas at "Sigiriya" the house that belonged to Victor Corea's sister and husband. Here, Mahatma Gandhi presented a colour poster under the headline Fighters for Swaraj that featured all the national heroes of India each in oval shaped bust size photographs to Victor Corea as his photograph too was included in the poster amongst the political giants of India. This alone was a glowing tribute to the campaign for freedom, initiated by Victor Corea that was somewhat similar to the campaign conducted in India. '

Beating of the hewisi at the Dalada Maligawa

When the beating of hewisi at the Dalada Maligawa was stopped on the orders of the Government Agent who was a Britisher, it was Victor Corea who single handedly defied the order and threatened to beat the hewisi himself if the Diyawadana Nilame did not order the temple to resume the beating of the hewisi.

Victor Corea told the GA in no uncertain terms that he should change his residence if the noise is disturbing his household instead of changing religious traditions that have been coming down from the time of the Sinhalese Kings. Since Victor Corea was known to be a man who lived up to his word, the GA fearing a revolt, revoked the order.

Family life
Victor Corea had six sons: Carlton Corea, (a Civil Servant), Norman Corea, (a well known Sri Lankan musician), Siddhartha Corea, (a Homeopathic Doctor and pioneer of Homeopathy on the island), Eric, Charles (Charlie) Corea (who worked for the Insurance Corporation of Sri Lanka), Sri Sangabo Corea, (a pioneer in the field of advertising in Sri Lanka) and a daughter, Sara.

His grand children went on the play pivotal roles on the national and international stages among them: Dr. Gamani Corea, Secretary-General of the United Nations Conference on Trade and Development and Assistant Secretary-General of the United Nations, Sri Sangabo Corea, a pioneer in the field of advertising in Sri Lanka and the media personality Dr. Vijaya Corea who was appointed Director-General of the Sri Lanka Broadcasting Corporation and Patron of the Edirimanne Corea Family Union in Colombo.

Death
Victor Corea died on 6 June 1962 at 91 years old. He will be remembered for his bravery and his battle with the British for independence. He will also be remembered for getting the Poll Tax abolished and being a brilliant Advocate.

Statue 

On 2 December 2008, the people of Chilaw paid tribute to Victor by having a statue built in his hometown. The statue was sculptured by Kalasoori Ariyawansa Weerakkody.

Ancestry
Victor Corea was a direct descendant of King Dominicus Corea also known as Edirille Rala, who was given the Kingdoms of Kotte and Sitawaka by King Vimala Dharma Suriya, the King of Kandy, in 1596. King Dominicus Corea, like his descendant Victor Corea, fought for and against the Portuguese, who had colonised Ceylon.

Film

See also
National Heroes of Sri Lanka
Dominicus Corea
Charles Edward Bandaranaike Corea
Charles Edgar Corea
James Alfred Ernest Corea
List of political families in Sri Lanka
Edirimanne Corea Family Union
Sri Lankan independence activist
Sri Lankan independence movement
Govigama
List of Govigama people
Mahatma Gandhi's visit to Chilaw, Sri Lanka

Bibliography
Great Sinhalese Men and Women of History – Edirille Bandara (Domingos Corea) By John M. Senaveratna, (1937)
Twentieth Century Impressions of Ceylon: Its History, People, Commerce, Industries and Resources By A.W. Wright, Asian Educational Services, India; New Ed edition (15 Dec 2007)

References

National Heroes of Sri Lanka
Sri Lankan independence activists
Sinhalese lawyers
Sri Lankan Christians
1871 births
1962 deaths
Members of the Legislative Council of Ceylon
Victor
People from Chilaw
Ceylonese advocates
Gandhians